Anna Yuryevna Fedulova (born 19 July 1978) is a Russian deaf cross-country skier. She made her maiden appearance at the Deaflympics representing Russia at the 1999 Winter Deaflympics. During the 2019 Winter Deaflympics, She surpassed Tone Tangen Myrvoll's record to become the most successful cross-country skier in Deaflympics history claiming a medal tally of 18 including 13 gold medals. She made her fifth appearance at the Deaflympics by representing Russia at the 2019 Winter Deaflympics.

References 

1978 births
Living people
Russian female cross-country skiers
Deaf skiers
Russian deaf people
Deaflympic gold medalists for Russia
Deaflympic silver medalists for Russia
Medalists at the 1999 Winter Deaflympics
Medalists at the 2003 Winter Deaflympics
Medalists at the 2007 Winter Deaflympics
Medalists at the 2015 Winter Deaflympics
Medalists at the 2019 Winter Deaflympics
Cross-country skiers at the 1999 Winter Deaflympics
Cross-country skiers at the 2003 Winter Deaflympics
Cross-country skiers at the 2007 Winter Deaflympics
Cross-country skiers at the 2015 Winter Deaflympics
Cross-country skiers at the 2019 Winter Deaflympics
21st-century Russian women